Archibald Richardson may refer to:

 Archibald Read Richardson (1881–1954), British mathematician
 Archibald Richardson (surgeon), State Surgeon of Ireland in 1774

See also
 Archie Richardson (1879–1981), Australian rules footballer